The 1904 Tennessee Docs football team represented University of Tennessee College of Medicine as an independent during the 1904 college football season.

Schedule

References

Tennessee Docs
Tennessee Docs football seasons
Tennessee Docs football